The 2021 Esiliiga was the 31st season of the Esiliiga, the second-highest Estonian league for association football clubs, since its establishment in 1992. The season began on 4 March 2021 and concluded on 21 November 2021. Defending champions Maardu Linnameeskond won their second Esiliiga title.

Teams

Stadiums and locations

Personnel and kits

Managerial changes

League table

Play-offs

Promotion play-offs

Tammeka won 3–0 on aggregate.

Relegation play-offs

Alliance won 4–1 on aggregate.

Results

Matches 1–18

Matches 19–30

Season statistics

Top scorers

Awards

Monthly awards

Esiliiga Player of the Year
Ats Purje was named Esiliiga Player of the Year.

See also
 2020–21 Estonian Cup
 2021–22 Estonian Cup
 2021 Meistriliiga
 2021 Esiliiga B

References

Esiliiga seasons
2
Estonia
Estonia